Gluck (born Hannah Gluckstein; 13 August 1895 – 10 January 1978) was a British painter, who rejected any forename or prefix (such as "Miss" or "Mr"), as Gluck was gender-nonconforming, also using the names Peter and Hig. Gluck joined the Lamorna artists’ colony near Penzance, and was noted for portraits and floral paintings, as well as a new design of picture-frame. Gluck's relationships with a number of women included one with Nesta Obermer: the artist's joint self-portrait with Obermer (Medallion) is viewed as an iconic lesbian statement.

Biography

Family and early life 
Gluck was born into a wealthy Jewish family in London, England. Gluck's father was Joseph Gluckstein, whose brothers Isidore and Montague had founded J. Lyons and Co., a British coffee house and catering empire. Gluck's American-born mother, Francesca Halle, was an opera singer. Gluck's younger brother, Sir Louis Gluckstein, was a Conservative politician.

Gluck was a pupil at the Dame School in Swiss Cottage until 1910 and then at St Paul's Girls' School in Hammersmith till 1913. That year Gluck was awarded a Royal Drawing Society silver star. Gluck attended St John's Wood School of Art between 1913 and 1916 before moving to the west Cornwall valley of Lamorna and joining the artists' colony there. Gluck moved to Cornwall with a fellow art student and partner, E M Craig, (1893-1968) who was known by her surname Craig. Little is now known about Craig but their relationship was significant to Gluck, who often spoke in later life of how the two had run away together. By 1918 they were living together in London, originally in a flat on the Finchley Road, then in a studio in Earls Court and, for a time, they also maintained a studio in Lamorna.

Persona and early career 

In the artistic community of Lamorna, Gluck began to adopt a masculine appearance and to defy fashion and gender norms. In 1916 Alfred Munnings painted Gluck smoking a pipe. Gluck insisted on being known only as Gluck, "no prefix, suffix, or quotes", and when an art society of which Gluck was vice president identified Gluck as "Miss Gluck" on its letterhead, Gluck resigned. In 1923 Romaine Brooks painted Gluck as Peter, a Young English Girl. Gluck identified with no artistic school or movement and showed work only in solo exhibitions. The artist's work was displayed in a special frame which Gluck invented and patented in 1932. This Gluck-frame rose from the wall in three tiers; painted or papered to match the wall on which it hung, designed to make the artist's paintings look like part of the architecture of the room.

1920s and 1930s
In the 1920s and 30s Gluck became known for portraits and floral paintings; the latter were favoured by the interior decorator Syrie Maugham. In October 1924, Gluck first had a solo exhibition, of fifty-six paintings, at the Dorien Leigh Galleries in South Kensington, London. During 1925 Gluck painted a series of works depicting theatre scenes and these formed part of the 1926 exhibition, Stage and Country at the Fine Art Society in London. That year Gluck's father bought Bolton House in West Hampstead where Gluck, with a housekeeper, a cook and a maid, would live until 1939. By 1928 Gluck was sharing Bolton House with the author and socialite Sybil Cookson. In 1931 the architect Edward Maufe designed and built a studio extension to the house. The following year Gluck had another solo exhibition, Diverse Paintings, at the Fine Art Society and also began a relationship with the British floral designer Constance Spry, whose work informed the artist's paintings. In 1934 Gluck and Spry spent some time at Hammamet in Tunisia.

Medallion

In May 1936 Gluck spent a weekend with Nesta Obermer at the Obermer family home, Mill House at Plumpton in east Sussex, and would later declare 25 May as their wedding day. Gluck ended the relationship with Spry and subsequently held a bonfire of personal letters, diaries and paintings at Bolton House. One of Gluck's best-known paintings, Medallion, is a dual portrait of Gluck and Nesta Obermer, the painter's lover, inspired by a night in 1936 when they attended a Fritz Busch production of Mozart's Don Giovanni.  According to Gluck's biographer Diana Souhami, "They sat together in the third row and felt the intensity of the music fused them both into one person and matched their love."  Gluck referred to it as the "YouWe" picture. It was later used as the cover of a 1982 Virago Press edition of The Well of Loneliness. Virago reprinted the book eight times in as many years making Medallion perhaps one of the most famous depictions of a lesbian relationship.

Thirty year hiatus 
While Gluck's early artwork was positively received by critics and the public through the 1920s and 1930s, by the interwar period between World War I and World War II the artist's work had fallen from popularity.  As the painter's romantic relationship with Nesta came to an end, so too did Gluck's artistic career for a thirty-year period of artist's block until Gluck experienced a final rejuvenation of creative energy at the end of the 1960s.

Later life
In 1937 Gluck had a third solo show at the Fine Art Society. The exhibition of thirty-three paintings, including Medallion, was attended by the Queen. In September 1939 Gluck closed Bolton House, which was then requisitioned by the Auxiliary Fire Service for war-time service, and moved to a cottage close to the Obermer home in Plumpton.

In 1943 Gluck met Edith Shackleton Heald and the two took holidays in Brighton and at Lyme in Dorset before, in 1944 Gluck moved to Chantry House in Steyning, Sussex, to live with Heald. The couple shared the house with Shackleton Heald's sister, Nora, and would remain there until Edith's death in 1976. In 1944 Gluck had an exhibition at Steyning Grammar School in Sussex. In 1945, Gluck sold Bolton House but retained the studio, which the painter continued to use until 1949 when Gluck sold that part of the property to Ithell Colquhoun.

In the 1950s, Gluck became dissatisfied with the artists' paints available at that time and began a "paint war" to increase their quality. Gluck felt that some paints were grainy in consistency, or looked 'dead' on the canvas. Gluck also said that some paints changed their apparent colour according to the direction of the brushstroke, and that some took too long to dry. Ultimately, Gluck persuaded the British Standards Institution to create a new standard for oil paints; however, the campaign consumed Gluck's time and energy to the exclusion of painting for more than a decade. During this time, Gluck and Edith acquired their second home at Dolphin Cottage, in Lamorna.

In the artist's seventies, using special handmade paints supplied free by a manufacturer who had taken Gluck's exacting standards as a challenge, Gluck returned to painting and mounted another well-received solo show of fifty-two paintings from across the artist's whole career. It was Gluck's first exhibition since 1944, and also the last. In 1977 Gluck donated 57 items, including clothing, accessories and pieces relating to the time spent in Tunisia to the Brighton Museum & Art Gallery.  Gluck died in 1978 in Steyning, Sussex at the age of 82.

Gluck's last major work, began in 1970 and completed in 1973, was a painting of a decomposing fish head on the beach entitled Rage, Rage against the Dying of the Light.

In 1980, two years after the artist's death, art dealers The Fine Art Society hosted a six-week memorial exhibition of 45 of Gluck's paintings.

References

Further reading
 Diana Souhami: Gluck: 1895 - 1978; her biography, London: Weidenfeld & Nicolson, 2000,

External links
 Seven artworks by Gluck at the Art UK site.
 Hannah Gluckstein in the glbtq encyclopedia project archives

1895 births
1978 deaths
20th-century English painters
Alumni of St John's Wood Art School
Artists from London
English Jews
Lesbian Jews
Gluckstein family
Jewish painters
Lamorna Art colony
English lesbian artists
English LGBT painters
Lesbian painters
People from Hampstead
People educated at St Paul's Girls' School
20th-century English LGBT people